The abolition of time zones involves replacing time zones with Coordinated Universal Time (UTC) as a local time.

History 

For most of part of history, the position of the sun was used for timekeeping. During the 19th century, most towns kept their own local time. The standardization of time zones started in 1884 in the US.

Proposals 

Arthur C. Clarke proposed to use a single time zone in 1976. Attempts to abolish time zones date back half a century and include the Swatch Internet Time. Economics professor Steve Hanke and astrophysics professor Dick Henry at Johns Hopkins University have been proponents of the concept and have integrated it in their Hanke–Henry Permanent Calendar.

Usage 
UTC as a universal time zone is already used by airline operators around the world and other international settings where time coordination is especially critical. This includes military operations, the National  Oceanic and Atmospheric Administration and the International Space Station. The effective international use of UTC shows that a universal time standard could work within the United States. The authority to modify this would be the Secretary of Transportation's.

Advantages 
 The same time is used globally, which removes the requirement of calculations between different zones.
 Possible health benefits as people who live on the eastern side of a time zone are out of sync with the circadian rhythms.

Disadvantages 
 The date will switch between sunrise and sunset in parts of the Americas and Asia-Pacific.
 Requires changes in linguistic terminology related to time.
 Conceptually, time zones would still be in effect as different regions would still carry out activities such as business hours, lunch, school etc at different UTC times, essentially trading one system for a tantamount one.
 It further complicates the tz database because historical time zones would still exist.

See also 
 Eastern Standard Tribe
 Calendar reform
 Time in China

References 

Time zones
Time scales